Phaeomolis ochreogaster is a moth of the family Erebidae first described by James John Joicey and George Talbot in 1918. It is found in Paraguay.

References

Phaegopterina
Moths described in 1918